James Arthur Payne (1894 in Highland Mills, NY – June 12, 1968 in Highland Mills, New York USA) was an American fly rod maker, designer and business owner.

The son of E.F. Payne and the owner of the E.F. Payne Rod Company, Payne designed and built bamboo fly rods for almost 70 years.  His rods are prized by fishermen and collectors. Experts consider Payne to have been one of the great designers and bamboo rodmakers in the history of fly fishing.

References

1884 births
1968 deaths
20th-century American businesspeople
American fishers
American woodworkers
Fly rod makers
People from Orange County, New York